

Wilhelm Berlin (28 April 1889 – 15 September 1987) was a German general during World War II. He was also a recipient of the Knight's Cross of the Iron Cross of Nazi Germany.

Awards and decorations

 Knight's Cross of the Iron Cross on 6 March 1944 as Generalleutnant and commander of the 227. Infanterie-Division

References

Citations

Bibliography

 

1889 births
1987 deaths
Military personnel from Cologne
German Army generals of World War II
Generals of Artillery (Wehrmacht)
German Army personnel of World War I
Recipients of the Order of the Cross of Liberty, 1st Class
Recipients of the Knight's Cross of the Iron Cross
German prisoners of war in World War II held by the United States
People from the Rhine Province
Recipients of the clasp to the Iron Cross, 1st class
Reichswehr personnel
20th-century Freikorps personnel